The National Union for Independence (UNI) is a militant socialist pro-independence alliance of political parties in New Caledonia. It is a component of the Kanak Socialist National Liberation Front (FLNKS) along with the Caledonian Union.

Since 2021, leader Louis Mapou has been President of the Government of New Caledonia

Components

The term UNI has now been changed to include a broad coalition of:

Party of Kanak Liberation (Palika) 
Melanesian Progressive Union (UPM)
Oceanian Democratic Rally (RDO)
Renewed Caledonian Union (UC-R) in the Loyalty Islands

The Palika is by far the largest of the four parties.

History

The term UNI was first applied in 1995 to refers to a dissident list from the FLNKS led by Paul Néaoutyine in the North Province. Since then, the term UNI refers to the broad coalition led by the Palika in various provincial elections since then.

In the 2009 provincial elections, the party won 10 seats (of which 8 went to the Palika, the other two to the UC-R and RDO respectively) in the Congress of New Caledonia and around 6.87% of the vote. However, in the South Province, the UNI ran on a common slate with the Caledonian Union and won three of the four seats won by that list (the Palika won one, the UPM won one, and the RDO won one).

References 

Political parties in New Caledonia
Melanesian socialism
Secessionist organizations
Socialist parties in France
Far-left politics
Political party alliances in France